Tambja verconis, common name Verco's nudibranch, is a species of brightly coloured "sea slug", more correctly a nudibranch, a marine gastropod mollusk in the family Polyceridae.

This is the type species of the genus Tambja.

References

External links
 

Gastropods described in 1905